Wangcun is a township in Wolong District, Nanyang, Henan, People's Republic of China, located in the western suburbs of Nanyang along China National Highway 312 (G312) just east of the G312 interchange with G55 Erenhot–Guangzhou Expressway. , it has 12 villages under its administration.

See also 
 List of township-level divisions of Henan

References 

Township-level divisions of Henan